College City may refer to:
 College City, Arkansas
 College City, California

ja:大学都市